Illustra was a commercialized version of the Postgres object-relational database management system (DBMS) sold by Illustra Information Technologies, a company formed by Michael Stonebraker and Gary Morgenthaler and several of Michael Stonebraker's current and former students including: Wei Hong, Jeff Meredith, Michael Olson, Paula Hawthorn, Jeff Anton, Cimarron Taylor and Michael Ubell.  The technology's extensibility model centered on DataBlade modules that defined types and associated index methods, operators, and functions for purposes and data domains that included Web publishing, search and manipulation of text, and management of geospatial information.

The company was sold to Informix Corp. in 1997.  The technology was folded into the Informix 7 OnLine product line, leading eventually to the creation of the unified Informix Universal Server (IUS) product line. The entire Informix product line was sold to IBM, which continues to extend Informix and offer several Editions of Informix for use under various license metrics include two Editions which are free of charge.

External links
"Informix leaps to objects: Informix Universal Server promises to raise the database technology bar," by Bill Rosenblatt

Proprietary database management systems